Everrette Thompson (born December 18, 1989) is an American football Defensive End who played at the University of Washington from 2008 through 2011.  Thompson went on to be signed by the Arizona Cardinals in 2012, remaining on their roster for 2 years.  He is now an assistant football coach at Northern Arizona University.

Football career

High school
Thompson attended John F. Kennedy Catholic High School in Burien, Washington, where he excelled as a football player.

Honors:
 Named All-American by ‘’PrepStar and ‘’Superprep magazines
 Selected for the Offense-Defense All American Game at the end of his senior year
 Named to the 3A All State First Team as a defensive lineman by the Associated Press
 Named to the ‘’Seattle Times'' All State Team

College football
Thompson played for the University of Washington Huskies from 2008 to 2011.  In his freshman year (2008), he played in 11 of the Huskies 12 games, starting in the final 3 games of the season.  In his sophomore year, he played in 10 of 12 games, starting in 3 of the games.  In his junior year, he started in all 13 games  — at defensive tackle and at defensive end.  In his final year, he also started in all 13 games — three at defensive tackle and the final 10 at defensive end.

Professional (NFL) football
Thompson tried out for the Arizona Cardinals at their May 2012 rookie mini-camp.  He remained a free agent until August 2012, when he was signed by the Cardinals.  He played in four games in August 2012.

Post-NFL career
Thompson has been an assistant coach, responsible for the line backers, at Phoenix College since August 2015. Thompson GA at Northern Arizona University in 2018 then became the Defensive line coach in 2019 - present.

References

External links
 ESPN profile
 NFL.com profile
 Cardinals profile
 Washington profile

1989 births
Living people
Players of American football from Seattle
American football defensive ends
Place of birth missing (living people)
Washington Huskies football players